The Colonel Jaime Meregalli Aeronautical Museum in an aviation museum located in Ciudad de la Costa, Canelones.

History 
Originating from an exhibition at Capitan Boiso Lanza Air Base, the museum was founded on 8 August 1954 by Colonel (Av.) Jaime Meregalli. The museum was moved a number of times in its early years, first to Air Base No. 1 in Carrasco and shortly thereafter to the Cilindro Municipal in downtown Montevideo. It became the Colonel Jaime Meregalli Aeronautical Museum on 17 March 1993. On 4 December 1997, the museum suffered a fire which damaged a number of aircraft in the collection. Eventually, in 2013, it was moved to Carrasco International Airport.

Collection 

 Beechcraft AT-11 Kansan
 Beechcraft T-34B Mentor
 Bell UH-1B Iroquois
 Bell UH-1H Iroquois
 Bleriot XI
 Castaibert VI
 Castaibert VI
 Cessna A-37B Dragonfly
 Curtiss-Wright SNC-1 Falcon
 de Havilland DH.60 Gipsy Moth
 de Havilland Canada DHC-1 Chipmunk
 DFS SG 38 Schulgleiter
 Douglas C-47A Skytrain
 Douglas DC-3
 Fairchild PT-19
 Farman
 FMA IA 58 Pucará
 Focke-Wulf Fw 44 J
 Hiller OH-23F Raven
 Lockheed 18 Lodestar
 Lockheed F-80C Shooting Star
 Lockheed T-33A
 Neybar N.1
 North American AT-6G Texan
 North American B-25 Mitchell
 Piper AE-1
 Potez 25 A.2
 Ryan Navion
 Santos-Dumont 14-bis – Replica
 Stinson 108-3

References

Further reading

External links 

 Official website
 Association of Friends of the Aeronautical Museum

Aerospace museums
Museums in Uruguay